Mr. Trance is a Colombian animated series, created by Valerio Veneras and produced by El Recreo Studio for Señal Colombia, based on the 2002 radio program of Radio 3 (RNE) La hora trance and the 2005 book Historias del Sr. Trance.

Synopsis
Mr. Trance is not an ordinary citizen. He wears a purple suit and looks like a stylish sea urchin. Like everyone else, he faces daily problems, but he has a secret weapon to escape from these situations: his amazing imagination!

Broadcast
The series was premiered on the channel Señal Colombia on September 13, 2013, exclusively for Colombia.

Cartoon Network Latin America acquired the international rights of the first season of the series and was premiered on October 5, 2015 for all of Latin America as part of its "Sabor Local" strategy, which consisted of broadcasting content made in the continent for audiences of the channel.

It has also been premiered in Colombia's Canal Guerra HD, Peru's Canal IPe and Chile's Novasur.

The third season premiered on April 15, 2019.

Awards and nominations

References

External links
 

2010s animated television series
Colombian television series
Spanish children's animated comedy television series
Animated television series without speech